Maksim Shilo (born 17 April 1993) is a Belarusian professional footballer who plays for Maxline.

Career
During 2020–2021 he played for Dordoi Bishkek in Kyrgyzstan.

Honours
Dordoi Bishkek
Kyrgyz Premier League champion: 2020, 2021

References

External links 
 
 

1993 births
Living people
Footballers from Minsk
Belarusian footballers
Association football defenders
Belarusian expatriate footballers
Expatriate footballers in Kyrgyzstan
FC Energetik-BGU Minsk players
FC Slavia Mozyr players
FC Smolevichi players
FC Luch Minsk (2012) players
FC Dnyapro Mogilev players
FC Dordoi Bishkek players
FC Minsk players
FC Dnepr Rogachev players